Mysterious Girl is a 2003 Hinglish language romantic drama film starring debutante Uday Kiran and Venya. This film was reused in the 2003 Telugu film Jodi No.1. The film was the first film Uday Kiran had shot for and was delayed for a period of four years.

Synopsis 
Gautam, a shy man, is in love with Anju, a misandrist. He asks Preethi, their common friend, on how he should express his feelings. Preethi lives in her uncle's house and receives a letter written by Pinky, Anju's pen pal. Preethi's uncle advises Gautam to disguise himself as Pinky and stay with Anju. Preethi and her aunt help Gautam transform himself into a woman. The real Pinky later arrives. The rest of the story is how Gautam reveals to Anju his true identity and his love.

Cast 
Uday Kiran as Gautam, a studious and reserved man who has issues expressing his love to Anju as she dislikes men.
Venya as Anjali (Anju) 
Srija as Preethi
Babloo as Babloo, Gautam's friend who has no problems in finding a girl and falling in love
Sumeet as Shiva, a man who falls in love with Pinky (Gautam)

Production 

Uday Kiran debuted with the Hinglish film Mysterious Girl, which was produced on a low budget. The film fared poorly at the box office as the film had trouble finding buyers. The film began production after the successful film Hyderabad Blues and the entire cast was from Hyderabad. Mysterious Girl was shot in an episodic format. In 2002, the producers of the film wanted to release the film after Uday Kiran became famous, but Uday Kiran prevented the film from being released by intervening with the Indian Producers Council. Kiran was not paid for acting in the film.

Release 
This film was first released before 2002 but was a box office failure.

Hindi version
Christopher Domingo of Full Hyderabad wrote, "The movie crawls at a snail's pace towards oblivion. Stone-faced expressions and poor dialogue delivery are just a couple of the faults in this excuse of a film. Absolutely nothing can be said about the direction, as there is none".

Telugu version
The film was dubbed in Telugu as Jodi No. 1 in 2003 with Pratani Ramakrishna Goud as the director. The film featured close-up shots from Holi (2002) and an additional scenes with Gautham Raju, Rajitha, Pratani Ramakrishna Goud, Siva Reddy and Gundu Hanumantha Rao. A critic from Idlebrain.com gave the film a negative review. Gudipoodi Srihari of The Hindu wrote that "Thematically and technically too, it is a disappointing film". Manju Latha Kalanidhi of Full Hyderabad opined that "Jodi No. 1 is the kind of movie that is bad at its best and disastrous at its worst".

References  

2000s English-language films
2000s Hindi-language films
2003 romantic drama films
2003 films
Indian multilingual films
Films shot in Andhra Pradesh
Indian romantic drama films
2003 multilingual films